Gibbes is a surname. It may refer to:

Bobby Gibbes, Australian fighter ace
Charles Gibbes, British academic
Frederick Gibbes (1839-1888), Australian politician
George Smith Gibbes (1771-1851), British physician
Heneage Gibbes (1837-1912), British pathologist
John Gibbes (Carolina) (1696-1794), English colonial officer in colony of the Province of Carolina
John George Nathaniel Gibbes (1787–1873), Collector of Customs for the Colony of New South Wales
Phebe Gibbes (died 1805) British novelist
Sir Philip Gibbes, 1st Baronet (1731–1815), planter on Barbados
Robert Gibbes (1644–1715), a colonial governor of Carolina
Samuel Osborne-Gibbes (1803–1874), Second Baronet, British Army officer, Freemason, plantation owner and politician
Sydney Gibbes (1876-1963), British academic
William Gibbes (disambiguation), multiple people
Wilmot Gibbes de Saussure (1822-1886) South Carolinian militia officer

See also
 Osborne-Gibbes baronets (originally Gibbes baronetcy), of the British peerage
 Gibbs (surname)
 Gibb (surname)